Waugh is an unincorporated community in Marion Township, Boone County, in the U.S. state of Indiana.

History
A post office was established at Waugh in 1891, and remained in operation until it was discontinued in 1900.

Geography

References

Unincorporated communities in Boone County, Indiana
Unincorporated communities in Indiana
Indianapolis metropolitan area